Pruna is a town located in the province of Seville, Spain. According to the 2014 census (INE), the city has a population of 2.740 inhabitants.

References

External links
Pruna - Sistema de Información Multiterritorial de Andalucía

Municipalities of the Province of Seville